Fier railway station serves the city of Fier in Fier County, Albania.

The station opened in 1968 after an extension from Rrogozhine was completed. It was a terminus until the line was extended southwards to Ballsh in 1975, though passenger services south of Fier did not commence until 1985.

Like Laç, Fier was a busy transportation hub in the days of the People's Socialist Republic of Albania for ores and fertiliser freight at a time when road infrastructure was still underdeveloped. In 1991, the International Fertilizer Development Center reported that 80-90% of fertiliser produced in Fier and Laç was transported by rail. Although the journey estimates were optimistic, the transportation methods were not suitable and were in need of revision.

Gallery

References

Railway stations in Albania
Railway stations opened in 1968
Fier